John Helmer may refer to:
John Helmer (musician) (born 1956), British musician and writer
John Helmer (footballer) (1938–1982), Australian rules footballer for Geelong
John Helmer (journalist) (born 1946), Moscow based blogger and journalist
John L. Helmer, American bobsledder